Paul Blair may refer to:
Paul Blair (American football, born 1882) (1882–1904), American football player
Paul Blair (American football, born 1963), American football offensive tackle
Paul Blair (baseball) (1944–2013), American baseball player
Paul Blair (Ontario politician) (born c.1954), Canadian politician
Paul Blair (swimming) (1949–2006), American swim coach
DJ White Shadow (born 1978), American music producer and DJ, whose real name is Paul Blair